Philipp Fyodorovich Bulykin (27 November 1902  – 17 April 1974) was a Soviet counter-admiral (1946) and a navigator of the Soviet Navy (1943 – 1947). He was the author of navigation books.

Gallery

Books by Bulykin

Awards 
 Order of Lenin (1950)
 Order of the Red Banner (1945)
 Order of the Patriotic War (second class) (1945)
 2 Orders of the Red Star (both 1944)
 Medals (For the Victory over Germany For the Victory over Japan, jubilee medals)
 Named weapon (Naval dirk and pistol) (1952)

References

Literature 
 

1902 births
1974 deaths
People from Gryazinsky District
People from Lipetsky Uyezd
Communist Party of the Soviet Union members
Soviet admirals
Soviet military personnel of World War II
Recipients of the Order of Lenin
Recipients of the Order of the Red Banner
Recipients of the Order of the Red Star